Aburi is a town in the Akuapim South Municipal District of the Eastern Region of south Ghana famous for the Aburi Botanical Gardens and the Odwira festival. Aburi has a population of 18,701 people as of 2013.

Transport

Road
Aburi is north east of Accra, and the journey from Accra to Aburi is about 45 mins (it became less when the dual carriage road from Tetteh Quarshie Circle to Adenta Barrier was completed by 2014).

Due to the altitude of Aburi, the climate is a lot cooler than neighbouring Accra. The road which climbs the hillside to Aburi is a toll road, with the current toll being 0.50 Ghc for a car, 1.00 Ghc for a 4x4.

There is a higher charge for vans and lorries. From the road most of Greater Accra is visible below, although the one stopping space for pictures on this section of road has a "No Stopping" sign.

Education
Aburi has several primary education, secondary education, higher education and further education institutions and Aburi is home to Aburi Presbyterian Technical Secondary School, which is linked to The Sixth Form College, Farnborough in Hampshire, England.
Aburi is also home to Aburi Girls' Senior High School started by the Presbyterian church. Aburi also hosts the Great Adonten senior High School.
For post secondary education, you can find the Presbyterian women's college of Education, formally known as PWTC Training college.

History and economy

The name Aburi is the adulterated version of ABUDE by the European missionaries and traders. 
Because of Aburi's location in the mountains of Ghana and its proximity to the coast of Ghana, an agricultural research farm was set up near Aburi by British residents in 1891. The area of the garden originally consisted of 20 hectares, in 1901 there were 17.8 hectares and in 1902 came to more than 40 hectares of new acquisitions, which was discovered during the last expansion with considerable resistance. Ultimately, the expansion could take place only through the application of governmental authority over state expropriation. The purpose of the Botanical Garden was originally to test field-building opportunities and to develop, which contributes to greater financial independence of Ghana. The focus of the garden was primarily in culture experiments with indigenous crops such as cocoa, rubber plants and cola. In addition, there were also ornamental and fruit plants grown of various kinds and small field trials with cotton and spices, vanilla and pepper mainly on cardamom and nutmeg. An inventory, dated 21 July 1900, lists 350 different plant species grown in Aburi. In addition, there was in 1903 in the center of the garden, a sanatorium. In 1901 the expenditure was for the garden equivalent of 44,312 marks (then German marks). Especially for the cotton experiments, a cotton planter expert from the United States (Texas) named Edmund Fisher, was employed, and who was, however, unfavorable for cotton in the rain forest, which is located in Aburi, which had only a few small test plots. A larger cotton research station was built on Edmund Fisher's recommendation in the grasslands by the Volta River built, and grown where cotton is the native culture from time immemorial and the cotton were made into clothing. It is not only an experimental farm that was established, but also tries to cheer up the locals to expand their cotton production. The latter was accomplished mainly through the distribution of seeds to the chiefs in connection with a purchase guarantee for all cotton harvested in a central market in buying at (9 '  N, 0 ° 6 ' O) on the Volta, where the cotton could be accommodated easily by water. In the Volta River could then also be the removal of the cotton. The most distant of the cotton growing area in Eastern region, is the landscape area which is about 13–15 km from the Volta River. It has also been used for treatment of raw cotton and where the Ginstation was built.

Today, on the grounds of the only botanical garden in Aburi, Ghana, is mainly home to many plants that were not originally native to Eastern region, but there is a collection of tropical plants that have been added.

Tourism
Aburi is host to one of the finest wood markets not only in Ghana but in Africa. Aburi has been rumoured that goods manufactured at the Aburi markets have found their way to South Africa to be sold on to tourists.

Aburi Botanical Gardens is result of a well known Ghanaian tourist destination.

Hotels and lodges
Aburi is home to many resorts and lodges for visitors.
Peduasi Valley Resort,
Hillburi,
The Landsdown Resort,
The Cactus Creek Hotel

Health 

 Kom Presbyterian Clinic

Peduase Lodge
Peduase is the location of a Presidential summer residence ('Peduase Lodge') built and first used by Ghana's first President, Kwame Nkrumah.It was used in the second republic of Ghana as the official residence of the then Ceremonial President, Edward Akufo-Addo.Since then it has not been permanently resided in by any Ghanaian head-of-state. Peduase Lodge is still used as a Presidential accommodation for the state of Ghana guests. 
The Presidential Lodge is in Peduase, a town near Kitase on the road to Aburi.

Notable personalities
Aburi is the birthplace of, or home to, several notable people, including:
Joyce Bamford-Addo - first female Justice of the Supreme Court of Ghana and first female Speaker of Parliament of the Fourth Republic
E. A. Boateng - First vice chancellor of the University of Cape Coast
Josiah Ofori Boateng - Retired Justice of the Supreme Court of Ghana
Alexander Worthy Clerk - Jamaican Moravian missionary and educator to the Gold Coast
Nicholas Timothy Clerk - Gold Coast theologian, missionary and minister, first Synod Clerk, Presbyterian Church of the Gold Coast
Carl Henry Clerk - Ghanaian educator, journalist and minister, fourth Synod Clerk, Presbyterian Church of the Gold Coast
Jane E. Clerk - Gold Coast educator and public education administrator
Ohene Djan - Ghanaian Sports Administrator
Samia Nkrumah - Ghanaian politician; daughter of Kwame Nkrumah, Ghana's first leader

Footnotes

  "Ginstation" (derived from English engine ) was a then-common term for a station with a larger system for the automated processing of anything. In most cases, however, was the term for a plant processing of raw cotton meant.

References

Further reading
 Gruner, Study trip to explore the cocoa and kola popular culture, the tropical planters, 8 (1904) 418–431, 492–508, 540-559

External links

 Ghana-pedia webpage - Aburi
 Aburi Botanic Gardens

Populated places in the Eastern Region (Ghana)